Western is a station on the 'L' system, serving the Blue Line's Forest Park branch. It is located in the median of the Eisenhower Expressway. It serves the Near West Side neighborhood and Crane Tech High School.

Bus connections 
CTA
  7 Harrison (Weekdays only)
  49 Western (Owl Service) 
  X49 Western Express (Weekday Rush Hours only)

References

External links 

 Western (Congress Line) Station Page Chicago-L.Org
 Western Avenue (Congress Branch) Station in 1958 @ America on the Move (Smithsonian Institution)
 Western Avenue entrance from Google Maps Street View

CTA Blue Line stations
Railway stations in the United States opened in 1958